The Chery Tiggo 3, or originally the Chery Tiggo, is a compact crossover produced by the Chinese manufacturer Chery since 2005 (debuted at the Shanghai Motor Show). It is the first product of the Chery Tiggo series. The original vehicle was facelifted in September 2010, and received the name change to Tiggo 3 and another facelift in 2014.

Overview
Launched in 2005, the original Tiggo crossover has many styling cues which resemble other compact crossovers, mainly the Toyota RAV4 and the Honda CR-V.

2010 facelift
In September 2010, Chery released the new 2011 Tiggo in China, essentially a facelift, built on the same platform. The 2010 facelift features a revised front end design and tail lamps.

2014 model rename to Chery Tiggo 3
During the Beijing Auto Show in 2014, another facelift was launched for the model and renaming the Chery Tiggo to the Chery Tiggo 3, slotting the crossover as the entry model of the following Chery Tiggo crossover series. The market debut was May 2014, and the power train is a 1.6 liter engine producing 126 hp and 160N·m. The transmission is a 5-speed manual transmission or a CVT.

2020 facelift
The Chery Tiggo 3 received another facelift in 2019 for the 2020 model year. The model was dubbed the "millionth edition" and features golden trim on the interior. The powertrains are a 1.5 liter engine producing 116 hp and 143N·m, and the transmission is a 5-speed manual transmission or a 2.0 liter engine producing 139PS and a maximum torque of 183N.m with a 5-speed automatic transmission unlike the previous version which had a 7-speed CVT transmission. In some markets it came with a 1.5 liter turbocharged engine producing 147 hp and 210N.m with a 9-speed CVT transmission.

International marketing
Outside of China, the Tiggo 3 has also been assembled in Uruguay from as of late 2007, as a result of a partnership between Chery and Argentine company SOCMA. The goal was to export the car to Argentina and Brazil – 30% to 50% share of local components are needed to receive zero-tariff status inside the Mercosur. As of May 2015, the plant was permanently closed.

The Tiggo 3 has also been assembled from knocked down kits in Italy by the DR Motor Company as the DR5.

The 2.0 L version is also being assembled in Egypt as of late 2008 under the Speranza brand name. It is the latest addition to the assembly line of Egyptian assembled Chery cars (Eastar, A5 and A1) by Aboul-Fotouh (a former BMW dealer in Egypt).

Malaysia

Italy
In Italy, it is assembled by the DR Motor Company and marketed as the DR5. It was introduced at the 2006 Bologna Motor Show and started the production in 2007, at the factory in Macchia d'Isernia.

It is available with three petrol engine options: a 1.6-litre, a 1.8-litre and a 2.0-litre, introduced in 2009.

Safety
A 2011 Tiggo 3 was put to an offset crash-test by the ANCAP in October 2011 and scored a poor result of only two stars out of five. The rating comes as the side impact was not conducted, after Chery issued a recall to rectify some issues with side impact protection, and it was awarded the maximum score that it could achieve in the side impact test. However, even the maximum score in the side impact test would not have been enough to improve the car's safety rating beyond two stars.

The Chinese-made Tiggo 3 in its most basic version for Latin American markets with 2 airbags and no ESC received 0 stars for adult occupants and 1 star for infants from Latin NCAP in 2019.

References

External links

Official website

Tiggo 3
Chery Tiggo 3
Chery Tiggo 3
ANCAP small off-road
Latin NCAP small off-road
Chery Tiggo 3
Chery Tiggo 3
Cars introduced in 2005